Michel Richard Joachim Rog (born 3 April 1973) is a Dutch politician and former trade union leader who served as a member of the House of Representatives from 2012 to 2021.  A member of Democrats 66 (D66) until 2006, he joined the Christian Democratic Appeal (CDA) in 2012. Since 2020, he has been an alderman in the municipal executive of Haarlem.

Career
Rog worked as a teacher of civics. Succeedingly he worked as a team leader civil aviation for trade union De Unie from 1999 to 2006. He was a member of the council of the former Amsterdam borough De Baarsjes from 2002 to 2006, where he led the Democrats 66 party group. From 2006 he was working as a board member and from 2008 as president of CNV Onderwijs, the teachers' union of the Christian National Trade Union Federation (Christelijk Nationaal Vakverbond).

He entered the House of Representatives after he was placed fifth on the Christian Democratic Appeal list in the 2012 general election led by Sybrand van Haersma Buma. Reelected in 2017, he resigned his seat in 2021 after he was inaugurated as the alderman of Haarlem for finance, sport and public space on 17 December 2020.

Personal life
Michel Rog is married and has two sons. He lives in Haarlem.

Decorations

References

External links 
  Europa-nu.nl website
  CDA website

1973 births
Living people
Christian Democratic Appeal politicians
Democrats 66 politicians
Dutch educators
Knights of the Order of Orange-Nassau
Dutch trade union leaders
Members of the House of Representatives (Netherlands)
Politicians from Haarlem
People from 's-Hertogenbosch
21st-century Dutch politicians